The Orel ("eagle" in Czech) is a Moravia-based Czech youth movement and gymnastics organization which emerged between 1896–1909 as Catholic Church-supported competitor of another Czech sport movement Sokol (founded 1862), oriented more nationalistic and rather anti-Catholic. Orel movement, defining itself as "Christian sport organization", still exists and currently has about 19,000 members. Since 1921 is member of international sport association FICEP. Party always cooperated in close with Moravian-Silesian Christian Social Party and later with the Czechoslovak People's Party.

A similar organization with the same name was organized also in the Slovene Lands and in Croatia, where it successfully competed with the local Sokol movement. It was dissolved in the early 1930s by the following dictatorship in the Kingdom of Yugoslavia.

See also 
Bežigrad Stadium
Strahov Stadium

Gallery

External links 
Home page 

Gymnastics in the Czech Republic
Czech nationalism
Social history of the Czech Republic
Sport in Czechoslovakia
Sport in the Czech Republic
Sports organizations of the Czech Republic